The Heavy Press Program was a Cold War-era program of the United States Air Force to build the largest forging presses and extrusion presses in the world. These machines greatly enhanced the US defense industry's capacity to forge large complex components out of light alloys, such as magnesium and aluminum. The program began in 1950 and concluded in 1957 after construction of four forging presses and six extruders, at an overall cost of $279 million. Eight of them are still in operation today, manufacturing structural parts for military and commercial aircraft. They still hold the records for size in North America, though they have since been surpassed by presses in Japan, France, Russia and China.

The program produced ten machines, listed below.

Background

The Heavy Press Program was motivated by experiences from World War II. Nazi Germany held the largest heavy die forging presses during the war, and translated this advantage into high performance jet fighters. Because of the shortage of aluminum, German aircraft manufacturers used forged magnesium structural components, formed to shape in closed-die hydraulic presses. The Soviet Union captured the largest German press to survive the war, with a capacity of 33,000 ton, and were suspected to have seized the designs for an even larger 55,000 ton press. The next two largest units were captured by the United States and brought across the Atlantic Ocean, but they were half the size at 16,500 ton. As Cold War fears developed, American strategists worried that this would give the Soviet Air Force a crucial advantage and designed the Heavy Press Program to help win the arms race.

Seventeen presses were originally planned with an expected cost of $389 million, but the project was scaled back to 10 presses in 1953.

Air Force Lieutenant General K. B. Wolfe was the primary advocate for the Heavy Press Program. Alexander Zeitlin was another prominent figure of the program.

Presses

Landmark designation
The American Society of Mechanical Engineers designated the 50,000-ton Alcoa and Wyman-Gordon presses as Historic Mechanical Engineering Landmarks.

External Links

References

1950 establishments in the United States
1957 disestablishments in the United States
Projects established in 1950
Projects disestablished in 1957
Public–private partnership projects in the United States
Industry in the United States
20th-century history of the United States Air Force
Cold War history of the United States
Presswork
Projects of the United States Air Force